John Gerwyn Davies (born 18 November 1959) is a Welsh former professional footballer who played as a goalkeeper.

Career
Davies began his career with  Cardiff City after progressing through the club's youth system. He made his professional debut in 1977 and went on to make seven league appearances during his two years in the first team, being used as cover for first choice goalkeeper Ron Healey. In 1980, he was sold to Hull City for £12,000, spending six years at the club. He also later played for Notts County on loan.

Following his retirement from playing, Davies worked for Hull City for nearly 30 years as a youth coach and helped found the club's community programme in 1990. He stepped down in September 2018.

References

1959 births
Living people
Welsh footballers
Cardiff City F.C. players
Hull City A.F.C. players
Notts County F.C. players
English Football League players
Association football goalkeepers